Gepp is an unincorporated community {pronounced: 'Jeep'} in western Fulton County, Arkansas, United States. Gepp has a post office with ZIP code 72538.

References

Unincorporated communities in Fulton County, Arkansas
Unincorporated communities in Arkansas